Heroes and Villains is a 2015 Nigerian romantic comedy film about two couples who almost divorce.

Plot 
A couple on a vacation aiming to re-new their lost sparkle in their marriage, Seek help/counselling from someone else who they believe knows better. Both approach the same person without knowing it. The Counselor doesn't like it when she realizes that they are both not following her instructions.

Cast 
 Seun Akindele
 Ivie Okujaye
 Belinda Effah
 Sylvia Oluchy
 Chucks Chyke
 Titi Joseph
 Maksat Ampe

Production 
The film was produced in 2015 by Happy Julien-Uchendu, directed by Shittu Taiwo.

References 

2015 films
Nigerian romantic comedy films